One cut homeobox 1 is a protein that in humans is encoded by the ONECUT1 gene.

Function

This gene encodes a member of the Cut homeobox family of transcription factors. Expression of the encoded protein is enriched in the liver, where it stimulates transcription of liver-expressed genes, and antagonizes glucocorticoid-stimulated gene transcription. This gene may influence a variety of cellular processes including glucose metabolism, cell cycle regulation, and it may also be associated with cancer. Alternative splicing results in multiple transcript variants.

References

Further reading